Antidesma is a genus of tropical plant in the family Phyllanthaceae formally described by Linnaeus in 1753.  
It is native to tropical Africa, S + E + SE Asia, Australia, and various oceanic islands. The greatest diversity occurs in Southeast Asia.

Description
Antidesma is a variable genus which may be short and shrubby or tall and erect, approaching 30 metres in height. It has large oval shaped leathery evergreen leaves up to about 20 centimetres long and seven wide. The flowers have a strong, somewhat unpleasant scent. The staminate flowers are arranged in small bunches and the pistillate flowers grow on long racemes which will become the long strands of fruit. The fruits are spherical and just under a centimeter wide, hanging singly or paired in long, heavy bunches. They are white when immature and gradually turn red, then black. When they are still white they have sour and astringent taste, sour taste when they are red and have sweet and sour taste when they are black.

The evergreen (sometimes deciduous) simple leaves have fine hairs and show no glands. They grow in an alternate arrangement, with entire, symmetrical blades. They are connected to the stem with a petiole (leaf stalk) and stipules (appendage at the base of a leaf stalk).

The flowers grow in a raceme, with 1 bract per flower, on a short pedicel (tiny stalk, supporting a single flower). Their color is light yellowish green, but may turn red when mature. These plants are dioecious, i.e. unisexual, with male and female flowers on separate plants. There are 3 to 8 fused sepals, but no petals. The male flowers have 2 to 8 stamens, but no pistils. The female flowers have 2 to 6 stigmas. They have a 1-locular ovary with 2 ovules.

The globose to ellipsoid fruits resemble a drupe. Their color varies from green to white, red and black. The fleshy and juicy fruits are edible with a sour to bitter sweet taste. Some individuals find Antidesma bunius berries to have a bitter taste. Those who detect this bitter taste (about 15% of subjects tested) cannot taste PTC, and similarly those who can taste PTC (about 68% of the subjects) cannot taste any bitterness in Antidesma bunius, while a minority of people cannot taste bitterness in either.

Species
There are 101 accepted species in the genus, as of May 2021. They are:

The following taxa have been revised:
Antidesma obliquinervium , now synonym for Antidesma montanum var. montanum
Antidesma pentandrum , now synonym for Antidesma montanum var. montanum
Antidesma subolivaceum , now synonym for Antidesma tomentosum var. tomentosum

References

External links
Antidesma (Flora of Thailand)
Malaysian Euphorbiaceae

 
Phyllanthaceae genera
Taxa named by Carl Linnaeus
Dioecious plants